Tired Mountain is a summit in Prince of Wales – Hyder Census Area, Alaska, in the United States.

Tired Mountain was named in 1883 by an officer of the United States Navy.

References

Landforms of Prince of Wales–Hyder Census Area, Alaska
Mountains of Alaska
Mountains of Unorganized Borough, Alaska